William Taylor Laimaka Cox is an assistant scientist in the department of psychology at the University of Wisconsin–Madison. He is an experimental cognitive scientist specializing in stereotyping, prejudice, and learning. His work explores the cultural and cognitive mechanisms that perpetuate stereotypes and prejudices and applies the understanding of those mechanisms to effective evidence-based interventions to reduce bias.

Cox and Devine have conducted research on the cognitive structure of stereotypes, demonstrating that some stereotypes primarily serve as categorization cues, especially those stereotypes related to social groups with non-visible defining features, like gay men. Whereas other researchers have argued that people have an accurate "gaydar" ability that enables people to visually identify whether someone is gay or straight, Cox, Devine, and their colleagues argued that "gaydar" is simply an alternate label for using stereotypes to infer orientation (e.g., inferring that fashionable men are gay), and thereby serves the function of a legitimizing myth to reduce the normative stigma associated with stereotyping. The researchers point out that past work arguing that people have accurate "gaydar" falls prey to the false positive paradox (see also the base rate fallacy), because the alleged accuracy discounts the very low base rate of LGB people in real populations, resulting in a scenario where the "accuracy" of gaydar reported in lab studies translates to high levels of inaccuracy in the real world.

References

Living people
University of Wisconsin–Madison faculty
1984 births